Boontham Huadkrathok, also known as by stage name  Sinum Chenyim (1 March 1954 — 1 December 2015) was a Thai actor and comedian. Sinum had 2 sons named Jeab Chenyim and Jack Chenyim Sinum's outstanding work was Bang Rak Soi 9 He played the role of A-Tu, husband of Na-Yao and father of Pang and Pik.

Sinum died on 1 December 2015 of cerebrovascular disease

Work 
 Stage
 Before become in Bangraksoi 9 on stage
 Drama
 Phra Aphai Mani
 Bang Rak Soi 9
 Muu 7 Dedsaratee
 Koja Panako
 Tee Tagoonsong
 Fon Nguea
 Rak Ther Tukwan
 Music
 Korruayduaykon
 Pitrak Pitsanulok
 Other
 Wig 07

References 

Boontham Huadkrathok
Boontham Huadkrathok
Boontham Huadkrathok
1956 births
2015 deaths
Deaths from cerebrovascular disease
Boontham Huadkrathok